Neil Vincent Lomax (born February 17, 1959) is an American former professional football player who was a quarterback in the National Football League (NFL), playing his entire career for the St. Louis / Phoenix Cardinals. He played college football at Portland State University, where he set numerous NCAA passing records running head coach Mouse Davis's run and shoot offense. Lomax was inducted into the College Football Hall of Fame in 1996.

College career
From Lake Oswego, Oregon, a suburb south of Portland, Lomax was a standout College football player at Portland State University, going from fifth-string freshman quarterback in 1977 on a partial scholarship to emergency starter to NCAA legend in the run and shoot offense of head coach Mouse Davis. By the end of his college career in 1980, he held 90 NCAA records, including  seven touchdown passes in the first quarter against Delaware State, which ended in a 105–0 shutout for the Division I-AA Vikings.
Two weeks earlier, independent Portland State crushed Division II Cal Poly Pomona 93–7. In his final collegiate game, Lomax threw for 474 yards with five touchdown passes as PSU waxed Weber State 75–0 to finish at 8–3; he ended his college career  with more than  passing and over a hundred touchdown passes.

Lomax also had a game at Division II Northern Colorado in 1979 where he was 44/77 for 499 yards passing. As of 2012, that game ranks fourth all-time at Portland State for yards thrown in a game.  
He graduated with a degree in communications in 1981.

Statistics
 1977: 102/181 for 1,670 yards with 18 TD vs 5 INT
 1978: 241/436 for 3,506 yards with 26 TD vs 22 INT
 1979: 299/516 for 3,950 yards with 26 TD vs 16 INT
 1980: 296/473 for 4,094 yards with 37 TD vs 12 INT

Professional career
Lomax was selected by the St. Louis Cardinals in the second round of the 1981 NFL Draft, the 33rd overall pick. Despite his college heroics, he had an up-and-down nine-year career for some very mediocre Cardinals teams, displaying brilliance in his two Pro Bowl years (1984 and 1987), but also occasionally playing poorly enough to be benched.

In Lomax' first season in 1981, he played in 14 games while starting seven of them (with 15-year veteran Jim Hart starting the other nine), going 4–3 while throwing four touchdowns and ten interceptions while passing for 1,575 yards on a 50.4 completion percentage. In the strike-shortened nine game season of 1982, Lomax started every game, passing for 1,367 yards for five touchdowns and six interceptions while having a 53.2 completion percentage. Lomax started the playoff game that the Cardinals had against the Green Bay Packers, throwing 32-of-51 for 385 yards, two touchdowns and two interceptions, but the Cardinals lost 41–16. It was his only playoff appearance.

Lomax started 13 games the following year while Hart started the other three. He went 7–5–1 while throwing for 2,636 yards with 24 touchdowns and 11 interceptions for a 59.0% completion percentage, but the team failed to return to the postseason, finishing 8–7–1 after starting the season 1–5.

In 1984, with the retirement of Hart, Lomax became the permanent starter, starting in every game, and he had his best season yet, throwing for 4,614 yards, 28 touchdowns, and 16 interceptions on a 61.6% completion percentage, all career highs. His passing yards rank 20th all-time for a season. He was named to the Pro Bowl that year. Although the Cardinals finished 9–7, the head-to-head record with the New York Giants and the Dallas Cowboys (for which the Cardinals went a combined 2–2, along with losing the season finale against the Washington Redskins) meant that St. Louis lost out on a playoff spot. Lomax started in each game again in 1985, but the team went 5–11, as he threw for 18 touchdowns and 12 interceptions on 3,214 yards and a 56.3% completion percentage. For 1986, Lomax started 14 games while Cliff Stoudt started the other two, with the former going 4–9–1 over the latter's 0–2 record. He threw for 2,583 yards while having 13 touchdowns and 12 interceptions on a 57.0% completion percentage. The following season was both Lomax's penultimate year as a Cardinal and the final one for the team in St. Louis. He started in 12 games, with Shawn Halloran (who started two games and went 1–1) and Sammy Garza (who started one game, losing it) doing the others; Lomax went 6-6 while throwing for 3,387 yards with 24 touchdowns and 12 interceptions for a 59.4% completion percentage. He was named to the Pro Bowl that year. In his final year in 1988, the Cardinals' first in Arizona, Lomax started 14 games (while Cliff Stoudt started two others) and went 7–7, throwing for 20 touchdowns and 11 interceptions for 3,395 yards and a 57.6 completion percentage.

Lomax was forced to retire before the 1990 season (after missing all of 1989) due to a severely arthritic hip. In 1991, he underwent hip replacement surgery. Lomax finished with a career record of 47–52–2, 136 touchdowns, and over 22,000 yards passing, with those categories (along with completions and attempts) being second most as a Cardinal, after Hart.

After football
Lomax was the head coach for Fort Vancouver High School in Vancouver, Washington for two seasons before resigning in January 2020. He resigned as his commute from Wilsonville, Oregon was too much.  He is now an assistant coach, for quarterbacks, at George Fox University.

References

External links
 
 
 

1959 births
Living people
American football quarterbacks
Phoenix Cardinals players
Portland State Vikings football players
St. Louis Cardinals (football) players
High school football coaches in Washington (state)
College Football Hall of Fame inductees
National Conference Pro Bowl players
Lake Oswego High School alumni
Sportspeople from Lake Oswego, Oregon
Players of American football from Portland, Oregon
Ed Block Courage Award recipients